Bauhaus Stairway, or in German, Bauhaustreppe, is an oil painting by German artist Oskar Schlemmer, completed in 1932. It depicts the Bauhaus school, a German art school that closed in 1933, due to the Nazis' taking power. It is on display at the Museum of Modern Art, in New York. The portrait depicts students ascending the stairs at the Bauhaus school, with all but one walking away from the viewer.

References

1932 paintings
Paintings by Oskar Schlemmer
Paintings in the collection of the Museum of Modern Art (New York City)